Arkens is a Hollow Post mill in Franeker, Friesland, Netherlands which has been restored to working order. The mill is listed as a Rijksmonument, number 15710.

History

Arkens was originally built in 1835 at a site to the north of its current position. It was built to drain the Arkens polder. Prior to 1910, it was fitted with four Patent sails. Photographs show that one pair of the Patent sails were wider at the tip than they were at the heel, the other pair were of standard construction. These were replaced by millwright Westra of Franeker with common sails which are wider at the tip than they are at the heel (Vlinderwieken ). Arkens is the only windmill in the Netherlands with this style of sails. A restoration of the mill was undertaken in 1955. The mill was moved to its current position in 1972, restoration taking until 1975. In 1994, a further restoration was carried out. Although restored to working order, Arkens is only rarely seen turning.

Description

Arkens is what the Dutch describe as a spinnenkop. It is  a hollow post mill on a single storey octagonal roundhouse. The mill is winded by tailpole and winch. The roundhouse and mill body are covered in vertical boards, while the roof of the mill is boarded and covered in dakleer. The sails are Common sails. The sails are carried on a wooden  windshaft constructed from four separate pieces of timber. The windshaft also carries the brake wheel which has 34 cogs. This drives the wallower (18 cogs) at  the top of the upright shaft. At the bottom of the upright shaft, the crown wheel, which has 28 cogs drives a gearwheel with 27 cogs on the axle of the Archimedes' screw. The screw is inclined at 23°. Each revolution of the screw lifts  of water.

References

Franeker
Hollow post mills in the Netherlands
Rijksmonuments in Friesland
Windmills completed in 1972
Windmills in Friesland
Windpumps in the Netherlands